The Internet Archive Scholar is a scholarly search engine created by the Internet Archive in 2020, it contained by the time some 25 million research articles with full text access. The materials available comes from three different forms - content identified by the Wayback Machine, by digitized print material and sources such as uploads from users and collection from partnerships.

References

External links
 Internet Archive Scholar

Internet Archive